Martin Roy Cheek (born 1960) is a botanist and taxonomist at the Royal Botanic Gardens, Kew.

Cheek attended the University of Reading, graduating with a B.Sc. in 1981 and a M.Sc. in 1983. He earned his DPhil at the University of Oxford in 1989.

Research
With Matthew Jebb, Cheek revised the pitcher plant genus Nepenthes in two major monographs: a skeletal revision in 1997 and a more in-depth treatment of the Malesian species for Flora Malesiana in 2001.

In these and other works, Cheek has described a number of species new to science, often in collaboration with Jebb. These include: N. abalata, N. abgracilis, N. alzapan, N. argentii, N. aristolochioides, N. cid, N. danseri, N. diatas, N. extincta, N. hurrelliana, N. kitanglad, N. kurata, N. lamii, N. leyte, N. mira, N. murudensis, N. negros, N. ramos, N. robcantleyi, N. samar, N. thai, and N. ultra. Cheek and Jebb also raised N. macrophylla to species rank.

Cheek and his research are featured in the documentary The Mists of Mwanenguba.

References

External links
The Mists of Mwanenguba

British taxonomists
English botanists
1960 births
Living people
Botanists active in Kew Gardens